Turner is an unincorporated community in Mississippi County, Arkansas, United States. During World War II, airmen cadets from the Royal Air Force, flying from their training base at Terrell, Texas, routinely flew to Turner on training flights. The community served as a stand-in for the British for Emden, Germany, which was the same distance from London, England as Turner is from Terrell.

References

Unincorporated communities in Mississippi County, Arkansas
Unincorporated communities in Arkansas